Augustin Joseph Caron (1774–1822) was a lieutenant colonel in the French army during the Bourbon Restoration.

He was accused and acquitted of conspiracy in 1820. In 1821 he was again implicated in a conspiracy, this time for attempting to free soldiers involved in the Belfort Conspiracy. To circumvent claims of entrapment, the government brought Caron before a military tribunal. Despite public skepticism, Caron was convicted and executed in 1822.

References

1774 births
1822 deaths
French military personnel
People of the French Revolution